Man-Thing is a 2005 monster film based on the Marvel Comics character of the same name. Directed by Brett Leonard, it stars Matthew Le Nevez, Rachael Taylor, and Jack Thompson, with Conan Stevens portraying the title character. The film is influenced by Man-Thing comics written by Steve Gerber and follows a Louisiana sheriff (Le Nevez) as he investigates a series of deaths in a swamp, leading to him encountering the eponymous creature.
 
Originally intended for a theatrical release in the United States, the film premiered on the Sci Fi Channel under the Sci Fi Pictures label in 2005. It grossed $1 million from a small release in international theaters. The film was the last to be released by Artisan Entertainment due to their closure in 2004.

Plot
At Dark Waters, a Native American sacred land containing an enigmatic swamp spirit, a teenager is murdered by a plant-like monster. The following day, young replacement sheriff Kyle Williams reaches Bywater and meets with deputy sheriff Fraser, who tells him the previous sheriff is among 47 missing persons since oil tycoon Fred Schist bought the ancient tribal lands from shaman and Seminole chieftain Ted Sallis, the first to disappear. Schist claimed that Sallis had sold the lands legally and then escaped with the money. Schist then asked the sheriff for help: local protesters opposed his perfectly legal activities, and mestizo scoundrel Rene Laroque was sabotaging his facilities. Williams investigates this while trying to find an explanation for the missing people, some of which were found brutally murdered with plants growing from inside their bodies. Photographer Mike Ploog and shaman Pete Horn tell Williams local legends about the guardian spirit, suggesting that it could be real.

As sabotage and murder continue, Williams investigates the swamp with Fraser and finds the previous sheriff's corpse. Medical examiner Val Mayerik admits that the previous sheriff had ordered him to file the deaths as alligator attacks, even if Mayerik believed otherwise.

Williams and Fraser try to track Laroque, who lives in the swamp, by using a canoe. At the same time, Schist sends the Thibadeux brothers, local thugs, to track and murder Laroque. The monster in the swamp finds the Thibadeux and kills them. Williams is ensnared by Laroque, who admits having helped Schist buy the lands. Laroque claims that Sallis was opposed to the sale; Laroque insists that the guardian spirit would keep on murdering until Schist stops desecrating the sacred swamp. Fraser tries to help Laroque, but the Man-Thing timely appears and murders Fraser; Laroque knocks Williams down and escapes. Williams wakes up and finds Ploog, who has blurry pictures of the monster; the sheriff seizes the photographs and forbids Ploog to come back to the swamp.

The following day, Williams interviews Horn and Schist, with the help of schoolteacher Teri Richards' help. Williams starts having romantic feelings for Richards. Horn goes to the swamp and tries to stop the Man-Thing with prayers and sacrificing his own life. The monster kills Horn, but is not otherwise affected by his efforts. That night, Mayerik autopsies the old sheriff and finds a bullet. He tries to tell Williams, but he is back at the swamp, unreachable. Mayerik tells Richards, and she goes to the swamp to tell Williams. Meanwhile, Ploog had returned to the swamp, trying to get a picture of the monster. Instead he startles Schist, who was in the swamp to murder Laroque. Schist shoots and kills Ploog. Soon afterward, Laroque ambushes and defeats Schist's son and minion Jake.

Williams finds Ploog's corpse and reasons that Schist murdered Ploog. He then meets Richards, who tells him about Mayerik's autopsy. Williams concludes that Schist is guilty of several murders, trying to incriminate Laroque simply to avoid punishment. According to Schist's confession to Laroque, he murdered Sallis and buried him in Dark Waters. Due to the magic embedded in the soil, Sallis returned as the Man-Thing. Richards reveals that she can guide Williams to Laroque's lair, but the Man-Thing starts chasing them. He chases them to the drilling tower at Dark Waters. In the tower, Schist is leveling his weapon at Laroque in an attempt to prevent Laroque from blowing it away with dynamite. Laroque nonetheless tries to detonate his bomb and is shot and wounded by Schist; Schist then wounds Williams.

However, the Man-Thing arrives and brutally murders Schist by filling his body with oil. The Man-Thing then moves toward Williams and Richards. Laroque sacrifices himself shouting at the monster and blowing the bomb. The monster survives the flames, but then is absorbed back to the land, allowing Williams and Richards to leave unharmed.

Cast

The characters portrayed by Mammone, Zappa, and director Leonard are named after Mike Ploog, Steve Gerber, and Val Mayerik, who all worked on the Man-Thing comic. A photo of Man-Thing co-creator Stan Lee can be seen on the board of "Missing People" who have been presumably killed by the Man-Thing.

Production

Development
In 2000, Marvel Entertainment entered into a joint venture agreement with Artisan Entertainment to turn at least 15 Marvel superhero franchises into live-action films, television series, direct-to-video films and internet projects. These franchises included an adaptation of the Man-Thing.
Plans to make a film about the character were first announced in 2001. It was variously considered for a direct-to-video release, or a theatrical release. After the success of Stephen Norrington's Blade (1998), Bryan Singer's X-Men (2000), M. Night Shyamalan's Unbreakable (2000) and Sam Raimi's Spider-Man (2002) the film was moved to a theatrical release to exploit on the success of superheroes.

Filming

Man-Thing was shot completely on location in Sydney, Australia; locations included Wisemans Ferry, Serenity Cove Studios at Kurnell for exterior swamp scenes and Homebush Bay. The initial budget was altered and the plot adopted a man vs. nature aspect for a more realistic sci-fi story. Principal photography for Man-Thing concluded in 2003.

Post-production
On October 27, 2003, it was reported that Artisan Entertainment, which had partnered with Marvel Enterprises in the production of Man-Thing and The Punisher films, was being purchased by Lionsgate Films. In February 2004, the film production and distribution company Lionsgate merged with Artisan Entertainment and received the film rights to Iron Fist, the Black Widow, the Man-Thing and the Punisher. In January 2004, producer Avi Arad said that the Man-Thing was more of a departure from the original comic than were Marvel's other film characters in that it was a horror film with a menacing central character. In April 2004, the film had been completed, with the finished print received and waiting to be tested with audiences, after which an exact release date would be determined. The film was rated R for violence, grisly images, language and some sexuality by the Motion Picture Association of America (MPAA).

Avi Arad, then CEO of Marvel Studios, admitted that it was a mistake not keeping tabs on the production, as it was being filmed so far away in Australia. He stated "The one hiccup we had was the one project we didn't micromanage. We were not going to the Outback, there was so much going on. We will never do that again. We should never have trusted anybody that far away without our supervision. Thankfully it was a small movie and not a disaster. If we were there and on top of it, it would have been a[n] amazing movie. I look at the {horror} genre, and I think 'Sh--, I can't believe this'. We've learned our lesson."

Effects
Marvel Studios producer Avi Arad said "the lead character in the Man-Thing movie would be a combination of prosthetics and computer-generated effects." From the outset, Man-Thing was intended to be a prosthetic, CG-enhanced creature. Arad told The Continuum during a visit to Marvel Studios, "So there was a great deal of R&D.... There's positional stuff happening on location, on the set, but at the same time the stuff you don't currently see in camera was always engineered to be enhanced by digital effects. So when you see the movie, hopefully the line is pretty blurry. It's not an all-CG creature."

Design
Special effects makeup was by the Make-Up Effects Group of Australia.
The Man-Thing was built as a full-size creature suit, portrayed by Conan Stevens, a  Australian actor, ex-wrestler and stuntman.

Although no full-digital Man-Thing model was made due to budgetary constraints, the suit was combined with digital moving branches and tendrils for certain sequences, also well as digital augmentation for the eyes.

Music
The band AzUR (DOG Productions' Wayne and Luke, joined by Bec And Freddie) recorded the song "The Man-Thing Lives Again" which was played over the end credits of the film. It was supposed to be released as a promotional video, but since the film was in a constant state of flux (financial, script, etc. ...) and was not going to theatres (as intended), the music video was pulled for lack of budget. Marvel did not want to leak advance images of the set and creature costume before the film's eventual release. One of the band members has worked on the footage and uploaded a remix on YouTube.

Soundtrack 

The Man-Thing album was composed by Roger Mason and was released on March 17, 2009. The soundtrack consists of 21 tracks. Its duration is over an hour long. The album was released by Nice Spot.

Release
In October 2003, Man-Thing had been scheduled for release on August 27, 2004. The US release date was set for Halloween (October 31) 2004, but when Marvel Enterprises released its second quarter financial report, Man-Thing was included in the 2005 line-up with a release date to be decided. Reportedly, the film was so bad that the test audience walked out before it was finished. So, Marvel put it back on video in the United States, since it would not be bankable in a domestic release. The film was released internationally in places like Russia and the United Arab Emirates. Man-Thing was released on April 30, 2005, as a "Sci-Fi Original" on the Sci-Fi Channel.

The character's film rights, along with the other Marvel characters whose film rights were previously acquired by Artisan Entertainment, have reverted to Marvel.

The film premiered in Singapore on April 21, 2005.

Home media
The film was released on DVD on June 14, 2005, in the United States.

It was released as a two-disc DVD in Region 2 format.

Reception

Box office
While the film was released direct to television in North America, it played theatrically in three international markets where it accumulated $1,123,136 in box office grosses. On April 28, 2005, Man-Thing opened in Russia and four other Post-Soviet states: Armenia, Belarus, Kazakhstan, and Moldova. The film opened on October 26, 2005, in the United Arab Emirates.
Finally, the film opened in Spain on March 3, 2006.

Critical response
Upon its release, Man-Thing holds  approval rating on Rotten Tomatoes based on  reviews.

Felix Vasquez from Cinema Crazed gave the film a negative review, writing, "While the special effects are really good, and the directing is decent, this just ends up becoming a really bad movie botching a really good concept". David Nusair from Reel Film Reviews awarded the film 1 out of 4 stars, calling it "the worst comic book movie ever made". Jon Condit from Dread Central gave the film a rating of 1.5 out of 5, writing, "Maybe in more capable hands than Brett Leonard's this could have been a creepy, albeit cheesy monster movie, but instead it just ends up falling flat." David Cornelius from eFilmCritic.com gave the film 2/5 stars, stating that the film was "too lame to be genuinely entertaining, not stupid enough throughout to be laughable". Adam Tyner from DVD Talk awarded the film 2/5 stars, calling it "thoroughly mediocre". Andrew Smith of Popcorn Pictures rated the film a 5/10, calling it "[a] Wasted effort but watchable anyway".

MCU version 
The Man-Thing appears in the 2022 Marvel Cinematic Universe special Werewolf by Night, motion-captured by Carey Jones and with Jeffrey Ford providing additional vocalizations.

References

External links
 
 
 

2005 films
2005 horror films
2005 television films
2000s monster movies
American monster movies
American natural horror films
Australian monster movies
Australian natural horror films
Artisan Entertainment films
Lionsgate films
2000s English-language films
Films scored by Roger Mason (musician)
Films about missing people
Native American horror films
Films about police officers
Films about racism
Australian films about revenge
American films about revenge
Films based on works by Steve Gerber
Films based on works by Stan Lee
Films based on works by Roy Thomas
Films directed by Brett Leonard
Films about hunters
Films set in Louisiana
Films shot in Sydney
American horror television films
Films about magic
Mass murder in fiction
Films about parallel universes
Peak oil films
Syfy original films
2000s American films
Live-action films based on Marvel Comics
English-language horror films